Route 91 may refer to:

Route 91 (MTA Maryland), a bus route in Baltimore, Maryland
London Buses route 91
Route 91 Harvest, a country music festival

See also
List of highways numbered 91

91